Adolf Patek (4 April 1900 – 9 September 1982) was an Austrian footballer and football manager.

He began his playing career in 1916 with Wiener Sport-Club. In 1919 his team reached the Austrian Cup finals, but was defeated by SK Rapid Wien 3-0. Along with Karl Jordan, Patek joined DFC Ústí for a short period before moving to DFC Prague. He quickly became known for his ability as a striker and was poached by rivals Sparta Prague. Joined by Pepi Horejs, whom he had played alongside in Vienna, Patek was part of the Sparta side which won the Czechoslovak championship in 1926 and 1927. He additionally won the 1927 Mitropa Cup with Sparta and participated also in the lost final match of 1930 Mitropa Cup, both against Rapid Wien.

Following the Second World War, Patek transitioned into a coaching career, beginning as an assistant in the Austrian Football Association before joining FC Bern from 1947-49 as a coach and trainer. From September 1949 until May 1953, he coached the Luxembourg national football team before coaching Karlsruher SC, where he reached his greatest success as a coach, in 1955 leading that team to win the DFB Cup.  In the following season, KSC qualified for the final round of the German Cup, ultimately falling to Borussia Dortmund.

In 1956, Patek became coach of Eintracht Frankfurt, winning the first German Cup final played under floodlights, against FC Schalke. After two years in Frankfurt, he spent another three as a coach at Bayern Munich, staying until 1961. After a short stint with SC YF Juventus, he returned to Austrian football to coach SC Wiener Neustadt, winning the 1963 Austrian Cup final against LASK Linz. This qualified the team for the European Cup, but they fell to Ştiinţa Cluj.

References

1900 births
1982 deaths
Footballers from Vienna
Austrian footballers
AC Sparta Prague players
Association football forwards
Austrian football managers
Karlsruher SC managers
Eintracht Frankfurt managers
FC Bayern Munich managers
SC Young Fellows Juventus managers
Luxembourg national football team managers
FC Bern managers
1. Wiener Neustädter SC managers
Expatriate footballers in Czechoslovakia
DFC Prag players
Wiener Sport-Club players
Expatriate football managers in West Germany
Austrian expatriate sportspeople in Czechoslovakia
Austrian expatriate sportspeople in West Germany
Austrian expatriate sportspeople in Switzerland
Expatriate football managers in Switzerland
Expatriate football managers in Luxembourg
Austrian expatriate sportspeople in Luxembourg